Events in the year 1930 in Turkey.

Parliament
 3rd Parliament of Turkey

Incumbents
President – Kemal Atatürk
Prime Minister – İsmet İnönü
Leader of the opposition – Fethi Okyar (12 August −17 November)

Ruling party and the main opposition
 Ruling party – Republican People's Party (CHP) 
 Main opposition – Liberal Republican Party (SCF) (12 August-12 November)

Cabinet
5th government of Turkey (up to 27 September)
6th government of Turkey (from 27 September)

Events
3 April – Women's suffrage (in local elections) was legalized
7 May – The 7.1  Salmas earthquake shakes northwestern Iran and southeastern Turkey with a maximum Mercalli intensity of X (Extreme). Up to three-thousand people were killed.
10 June – Agreement between Turkey and Greece concerning the population exchange problems in the 1920s.    
12 August – Liberal Republican Party (SCF) was founded 
26 September – People Republic Party, a second opposition party was founded
27 September – New government
17 November – SCF dissolved itself
23 December – Menemen Incident in which a group of reactionaries who opposed Atatürk's reforms killed Mustafa Fehmi Kubilay a young lieutenant.

Births
26 February – Orhan Karaveli, journalist and writer
2 March – Neşe Aybey, miniaturist
23 April – Şarık Tara, civil engineer and contractor
17 June – Adile Naşit, theatre player
1 September – Turgut Özakman, writer
23 September – Çelik Gülersoy, lawyer and historical preservationist 
9 October – Rahmi Koç, industrialist
30 December – Dündar Ali Osman, 45th Head of the House of Osman (in Syria)

Deaths
26 February – Ahmet Rıza (born in 1858), politician
30 March – Hodja Ali Rıza (born in 1858), painter
8 August – Alaaddin Koval (born in 1878), general
23 December – Mustafa Fehmi Kubilay (born in 1906), lieutenant (lynched)

Gallery

References

 
Years of the 20th century in Turkey
Turkey
Turkey
Turkey